Abingdon Road is the second album by rock band Abingdon Boys School, released on January 27, 2010. In addition to new tracks, the album contains singles released since the band's first full album and a cover of "Sweetest Coma Again", originally found on Luna Sea Memorial Cover Album -Re:birth-, an album of Luna Sea covers dedicated to the legendary rock band.

The limited edition release will be packaged with a DVD featuring live footage recorded at the Inazuma Rock Festival on September 19, 2009.

Track listing

Personnel

 T.M. Revolution – vocals
 Hiroshi Shibasaki – guitar
 Sunao – guitar
 Toshiyuki Kishi – keyboard, programming, and turntables
 Ikuo;- Bass
 Hazegawa Koji;- Drums

References

2010 albums
Abingdon Boys School albums